Santo Anastácio is a municipality in the state of São Paulo in Brazil. The population is 20,866 (2020 est.) in an area of 553 km². The elevation is 436 m.

References

Municipalities in São Paulo (state)